Benyagoub Sebbah (born March 13, 1960, in Oran) is a former Algerian football midfielder and current Assistant Coach of MC Oran. He is played essentially for MC Oran.

Honours
 Won the Algerian league three times with MC Oran in 1988, 1992 and 1993
 Won the Algerian Cup twice with MC Oran in 1984, 1985
 Finalist of the African Cup of Champions Clubs once with MC Oran in 1989

References

External links 
 

1960 births
Living people
Algerian footballers
Algeria international footballers
Footballers from Oran
USM Oran players
MC Oran players
MC Oran managers
Association football midfielders
Algerian football managers
21st-century Algerian people